Die Sitte is a German television series.

See also
List of German television series

External links
 

German drama television series
German crime television series
2000s German police procedural television series
2001 German television series debuts
2004 German television series endings
Television shows set in Cologne
German-language television shows
RTL (German TV channel) original programming